Birger Sjöberg (1885–1929) was a Swedish poet, novelist and songwriter, whose best-known works include the faux-naïf song collection Fridas Bok (Frida's Book) and the novel Kvartetten Som Sprängdes (The Quartet That Split Up), a somewhat Dickensian relation about stock-exchange gambling in the twenties, and the frantic efforts to recover.

Originally a journalist, Sjöberg wrote songs in his spare time. His debuted as a serious writer with the 1922 publication of Fridas Bok (Frida's Book), which was both a critical and popular success. Following a series of concert tours, he withdrew from public life and focused on his writing.

After his death in 1929, a new series of songs and a selection of poems were published.

Selected works
Prose and poetry by Birger Sjöberg:
Fridas Bok (Frida's Book) 1922
Kvartetten Som Sprängdes (The Quartet That Split Up) 1924
Kriser Och Kransar (Crises And Laurel Wreaths) 1926
Fridas Andra Bok (Frida's Second Book) 1929
Minnen Från Jorden (Memories From The Earth) 1940

Translations of his works in English
Anthology of Swedish Lyrics 1930 
Modern Swedish Poetry Pt. 2 1936 
Scandinavian Songs and Ballads 1950 
Twentieth Century Scandinavian Poetry 1950 
Twelve Pieces from Frida’s Book 1975 
When First I Ever Saw You LP 1980 
Swedes On Love CD 1991 
Frida's New Clothes 2008

His life in English
A History of Swedish Literature 1961 
A History of Swedish Literature 1989 
A History of Swedish Literature 1996

Image gallery

See also
Swedish ballad tradition

References

External links

.
Birger Sjöberg at the Umeå Academic Choir.
Swedish
Birger Sjöberg at Swedish music and film.
Fridas bok at Project Runeberg.
Fridas andra bok at Project Runeberg.
Fridas bok at Swedish Wikisource.
English
Birger Sjöberg profile
Paris of the North
Translations
The butterfly at Haga (Fjärilen på Haga)
Frida cleans house (Frida i vårstädningen)
The first time that I saw you (Den första gång jag såg dig)

Swedish songwriters
Swedish poets
Swedish male writers
1885 births
1929 deaths
People from Vänersborg Municipality